Qinghong is a Chinese given name in pinyin (Ch'ing-hung in the Wade–Giles scheme). It may refer to:

 Liu Qinghong (born 1996), Chinese long distance runner
 Zeng Qinghong (born 1939), Chinese politician
 Zeng Qinghong (born 1962), Chinese politician
 Shanghai Dreams, a 1995 Chinese film whose Chinese title is Qīng Hóng

See also
 Jinghong (disambiguation)
 Qinggong, a technique in Chinese martial arts
 Qinglong (disambiguation)